Pegasus lancifer, the sculptured seamoth or sculptured dragonfish, is a species of fish in the family Pegasidae which is endemic to the temperate seas of southern Australia and Tasmania. They are known to gather in large numbers in the shallows of estuaries. Individuals can bury themselves in the sediment and change colours to camouflage them. After spawning the pair separates and the eggs begin a pelagic phase.

Gallery

References

lancifer
Taxa named by Johann Jakob Kaup
Fish described in 1861